Radulski is a surname. Notable people with the surname include:

Tom Radulski (born 1955), American football player and coach
Yulian Radulski (1972–2013), Bulgarian chess grandmaster